Sweetfin (formerly Sweetfin Poké) is a Los Angeles-based fast casual restaurant chain that serves poke bowls. Sweetfin was founded in 2013 by Alan Nathan, Brett Nestadt, Seth Cohen and Executive Chef Dakota Weiss, with their first store opening in Santa Monica in April 2015. As of 2018 Sweetfin has nine locations in the California region: eight in Los Angeles and one in San Diego. Sweetfin is regarded as having started the trend of poke specific restaurants outside of Hawaii.

References 

Fast casual restaurants
Fast-food chains of the United States
2013 establishments in California
Restaurants established in 2013
Companies based in Santa Monica, California